Cooper v Hobart, 2001 SCC 79 is a Supreme Court of Canada case that redefined the "Anns test", which was adopted in Kamloops (City of) v Nielsen to establish a duty of care in civil tort cases.

Background 
Eron was a mortgage broker under the Mortgage Broker's Act. Cooper had advanced money to Eron. Eron's mortgage license was suspended by Hobart acting in his official capacity as Mortgage Broker Registrar under the Act.

Cooper alleged that Hobart breached a duty of care that he allegedly owed to her and other investors because he had been aware of the serious violations of the Act committed by Eron, and not suspended its license soon enough. The Registrar of Mortgage Brokers had become aware of Eron in August 1996 and did not suspend his licence until October 1997.

At trial, the Registrar was found to have owed a duty of care to the investors. In appeal, the Court overturned the verdict on grounds that there was no sufficient proximity.

Reasoning of the Court
McLachlin CJ and Major J found that if there is no existing category that would create a duty of care, the plaintiff must show proximity, a close and direct relationship with the defendant. In this case, there was no such proximity because the statute governing the Registrar imposed no such duty. While the losses to the plaintiff were foreseeable, proceeding to a policy analysis was unnecessary.

The Court noted that even if it had gone to a policy analysis, the duty of care would be negated by policy considerations as a ruling for the plaintiff would in effect create a public insurer for investors on taxpayer dollars.

Aftermath and precedence
This case concerns pure economic loss. It is a purported application of the "Anns–Kamloops test", however it actually adopts a new standard.

See also
 List of Supreme Court of Canada cases (McLachlin Court)

External links
 

Supreme Court of Canada cases
Canadian tort case law
2001 in Canadian case law